Francisco Valadas Júnior (born 2 January 1906, date of death unknown) was a Portuguese equestrian. He placed tenth in individual dressage, and won a bronze medal in team dressage at the 1948 Summer Olympics in London. He competed in dressage at the 1952 Summer Olympics in Helsinki. His horse was 'Feitico'.

References

External links

1906 births
Year of death missing
Portuguese male equestrians
Portuguese dressage riders
Olympic equestrians of Portugal
Olympic bronze medalists for Portugal
Equestrians at the 1948 Summer Olympics
Equestrians at the 1952 Summer Olympics
Olympic medalists in equestrian
Medalists at the 1948 Summer Olympics